4 is the fourth and final studio album by Gerling, produced by Ethan Johns in Hollywood, California, United States, released in March 2006. The album peaked at number 78 on the ARIA charts.

Track listing

Charts

References 

2006 albums
Gerling albums
Albums produced by Ethan Johns